Luis M. Diaz is a former New York State Assembly member for the 86th district, first elected in 2002 when the Bronx district was created. He is a Democrat. In 2008, he stepped down as assemblyman to take a community affairs position in the administration of Governor David A. Paterson. Diaz was appointed Bronx County Clerk for the New York State Supreme Court in 2009. He was suspended in 2020 and resigned in 2022, when he pleaded guilty for falsely certifying that an organized-crime defendant had completed his court-mandated community service from a previous sentence.

Diaz was born in Aguadilla, Puerto Rico. He moved to the Bronx as a child, attended public schools, and received a B.A. in Political Science from SUNY Old Westbury. Prior to his election, he served as executive director of Neighborhood Enhancement Training and Services, a nonprofit social service organization in the Bronx. He has five children.

References

1950s births
Living people
Hispanic and Latino American state legislators in New York (state)
Democratic Party members of the New York State Assembly
People from Aguadilla, Puerto Rico
Puerto Rican people in New York (state) politics
Year of birth missing (living people)
Politicians from the Bronx
New York (state) politicians convicted of crimes